Emiko Davies is an Australia-born cookbook author, food journalist and food blogger, known for a focus on regional Italian food. She is based in Florence, Italy.

About 
Emiko Davies is from Canberra, Australia and raised between Australia and China. She is of Japanese-Australian ethnicity. Davies attended Rhode Island School of Design (RISD) in Providence, Rhode Island and graduated with a B.F.A. degree in Printmaking in 2002. She was inspired to cook by the book, Science in the Kitchen and the Art of Eating Well (La Scienza in Cucina E L'arte Di Mangiar Bene, 1891) by Pellegrino Artusi and through experiencing the food of Florence.

She has written about food for The Canberra Times, The Guardian, Newsweek, Condé Nast Traveller, Gourmet Traveller, Food52, amongst others. She had a weekly column on Regional Italian Food on Food52.

Publications

Books

Articles

References

External links 
 Podcast: How to Cook Like.. Emiko Davies (2019) from The Delicious podcast

People from Canberra
Writers from Florence
Cookbook writers
Women cookbook writers
Italian cookbook writers
Australian bloggers
Australian women bloggers
Italian bloggers
Italian women bloggers
Rhode Island School of Design alumni
Australian people of Japanese descent
Writers from Canberra
Living people
Year of birth missing (living people)